Gurbaksh Singh Kanhaiya ( 1759 - 1785) was the eldest son and heir of Jai Singh Kanhaiya, the chief of the Kanhaiya Misl. He was the father of Maharani Mehtab Kaur and thus, the father-in-law of Maharaja Ranjit Singh, the founder of the Sikh Empire.

Early life

Gurbaksh Singh, the only son and heir of Jai Singh Kanhaiya, was born in 1759 to his wife Desan Kaur, who was the widow of Jhanda Singh. His father, Jai Singh, was the founder and leader of the Kanhaiya Misl. Gurbaksh Singh was married at the age of seven to Sada Kaur, a daughter of Sardar  Daswandha Singh Alkol. The couple had one child together, a daughter named Mehtab Kaur, who was born in 1782.

She was married in 1796 to Ranjit Singh, the successor of Maha Singh, the leader of the Sukerchakia Misl, who were a rival of the Kanhaiya Misl.

Military Career

In 1778, A quarrel arose between Ramgarhia and Kanhaiyas, Jai Singh Kanhaiya and Haqiqat Singh Kanhaiya Supported by Jassa Singh Ahluwalia, Maha Singh attacked Sri Hargobindpur headquarter of Jassa Singh Ramgarhia and captured it, At the same time Gurbaksh Singh Besieged Batala, Mala Singh brother of Jassa Singh Ramgarhia He was infamous among people, His officers and leading citizens of Batala, made a common cause and admitted Gurbaksh Singh Kanhaiya into the city and Mala Singh fled away, Batala become the headquarter of Kanhaiya Misl,

In 1783, Sansar Chand invited Jai Singh Kanhaiya to Help get him Kangra Fort, Jai Singh deputed Gurbaksh Singh to Kangra, He Besieged the fort, Saif Ali Khan died when the siege was going on, his son jiwan Khan took the charge of defenses, Gurbaksh Singh suggested to Sansar Chand to offer temptation of cash and jagir to the Jiwan Khan for surrendering the fort to the Raja, when negotiation were completed, Gurbaksh Singh secretly hinted treachery on the part of Raja, and offered a large sum of money on his own behalf to Jiwan Khan, On receiving the heavy bribe jiwan Khan admited Sikh troops inside the fort to the sheer chargin of the Raja, Gurbaksh Singh established his authority over all  the Kangra hills up to Palanpur.

Death
The Kanhaiyas, who had replaced the Bhangis as the most powerful misl, disputed Ranjit Singh's father's right to plunder Jammu, and in one of the many skirmishes between the two misls, Gurbaksh Singh was killed in battle against Maha Singh in February 1785.

In the absence of any heir, Gurbaksh Singh's widowed wife, Sada Kaur (an intelligent and ambitious woman) became the chief of the Kanhaiya Misl after her father-in-law's death in 1789. She played an important role in Ranjit Singh's rise to power in Punjab and used to lend support of the Kanhaiya misl to Ranjit Singh till 1821, when she developed differences with him and as a consequence lost her territory to him.

In popular culture
Rumi Khan portrays Gurbaksh Singh in Life OK's historical drama Sher-e-Punjab: Maharaja Ranjit Singh.

See also
Ranjit Singh
Sada Kaur

References

1759 births
1785 deaths
Indian Sikhs
People killed in action